Stephen Michael Frank (born January 14, 1975) is an American former Major League Baseball outfielder who played for the Cincinnati Reds in 1998.

Biography
Frank was born in Pomona, California and graduated from Escondido High School in (Escondido, California. He played college baseball at Santa Clara University. In 1995, he played collegiate summer baseball with the Wareham Gatemen of the Cape Cod Baseball League.

Frank was drafted by the Cincinnati Reds in the 7th round of the 1997 Major League Baseball Draft, and made his major league debut on June 19, 1998. In 2000, he was traded to the New York Yankees with Denny Neagle for Jackson Melián, Drew Henson, Brian Reith and Ed Yarnall.

References

1975 births
Living people
Major League Baseball outfielders
Billings Mustangs players
Cincinnati Reds players
Indianapolis Indians players
Chattanooga Lookouts players
Columbus Clippers players
Louisville RiverBats players
New Haven Ravens players
Memphis Redbirds players
Sportspeople from Pomona, California
Baseball players from California
Sportspeople from Escondido, California
Santa Clara Broncos baseball players
Wareham Gatemen players